Marumba saishiuana is a species of moth of the family Sphingidae.

Distribution 
It is known from south-eastern China, southern South Korea, Japan (Tsushima Island), northern Thailand, northern Vietnam and Taiwan.

Description 
The wingspan is 75–85 mm. Adults are on wing from May to July in Korea.

Subspecies
Marumba saishiuana saishiuana (south-eastern China, southern South Korea, Japan (Tsushima Island), northern Thailand and northern Vietnam)
Marumba saishiuana formosana Matsumura, 1927 (Taiwan)

References

Marumba
Moths described in 1924
Moths of Japan